CMLL Super Viernes (Spanish for "CMLL Super Friday") is the Mexican professional wrestling promotion Consejo Mundial de Lucha Libre's banner event that takes place every Friday in Arena México in Mexico City, Mexico. The shows take place every Friday all year long, except when CMLL schedules a "Super Show" or a pay-per-view (PPV) to take its place since all CMLL PPVs and Super Shows take place on Friday nights in Arena México.

Event history
Founded in 1933 as Empresa Mexicana de Lucha Libre (EMLL) and renamed in 1990, CMLL is the world's oldest professional wrestling promotions still active today. Unlike most wrestling promotions in the world CMLL generally does not tour, preferring to hold weekly events in the same buildings on the same nights, only rarely promoting shows in other venues. The Super Viernes shows dates back to at least 1938, making it the longest-running weekly show of any kind. Super Viernes was originally held in Arena Modelo, then moved to Arena Coliseo in the 1950s and finally moved to Arena México in 1956 upon the completion of the building. Since 1956 CMLL has held their Super Viernes events on every Friday night except for when the promotion takes a break at the end of the year, when they promote a super card or PPV on Friday night or due to circumstances beyond CMLL's control.

Two notable events have interrupted CMLL's Friday night shows: the 1985 Mexico City earthquake stopped the Super Viernes shows until it was determined that Arena México was structurally sound. In the spring and summer of 2009 the Swine Flu pandemic shut down Arena México shows for a couple of weeks after the government urged people not to gather in large groups while the epidemic was at its worst.

Event significance
CMLL Super Viernes is CMLL's biggest and most important weekly show; it generally draws the largest crowds and features the biggest stars of CMLL in the main events. Wrestlers say that working in Arena Mexico on Friday nights is the "mark of approval" for young wrestlers. Super Viernes has seen many championship matches and changes over the years and also been the site for many Luchas de Apuestas, bet matches where wrestlers put either their mask or hair on the line. While CMLL is not as storyline-driven as other companies such as the World Wrestling Entertainment (WWE) or New Japan Pro-Wrestling (NJPW), the most important storylines or feud that are promoted in CMLL play out during the Super Viernes shows.

The Friday night Arena México shows normally host all of CMLL's annual tournaments, Super Viernes normally hosts tournaments such as the Torneo Gran Alternativa, Leyenda de Plata, Leyenda de Azul, CMLL International Gran Prix, Reyes del Aire and the Universal Champion tournament. From 1999 to 2001 Super Viernes also hosted the Copa Arena México Trios tournament and has been the site of CMLL's La Copa Junior tournaments.

References